The official 2014/2015 snooker world ranking points for the professional snooker players on the World Snooker Main Tour in the 2014–15 season are based on performances in ranking and minor-ranking tournaments over a two-year rolling period. Following an overhaul of the world rankings it is the first season where the tariffs are based on prize money. Rather than being awarded points according to tariffs preset by the governing body as in previous seasons, the players are now ranked by their prize money earnings in tournaments that carry ranking status. The only exception to this is when a player loses their first match: for the 2012/2013 and 2013/2014 seasons only half the money earned for the event counts towards the player's ranking, and for the 2014/2015 season a player will not receive any points at all for that tournament. Due to the transition to the new ranking system, the start ranks of the 2014/2015 season for the top 64 players are incongruent with the ranks of the players at the end of the previous season.

The rankings at the start of 2014/2015 season are determined by prize money earned in the 2012/2013 and 2013/2014 seasons and updated after every tournament carrying ranking status. As points are earned from tournaments throughout the current season, the points from the corresponding tournaments from two seasons previous are dropped. The rankings set the official seedings at the start of the season and at six further stages. The total points accumulated by the cut-off dates for the revised seedings are based on all the points up to that date in the 2014/2015 season, all of the points from the 2013/2014 season, and the points from the 2012/2013 season that have not yet been dropped. The total points from the 2013/2014 and 2014/2015 seasons set the rankings at the start of the 2015/2016 season.

Seeding revisions

Ranking points

Notes

References 

2014
Ranking points 2014
Ranking points 2015